Alstonine is an indoloquinolizidine alkaloid and putative antipsychotic constituent of various plant species including Alstonia boonei, Catharanthus roseus, Picralima nitida, Rauwolfia caffra and Rauwolfia vomitoria. In preclinical studies alstonine attenuates MK-801-induced hyperlocomotion, working memory deficit and social withdrawal. It also possesses anxiolytic-like effects in preclinical studies, attenuates amphetamine-induced lethality and stereotypy as well as apomorphine-induced stereotypy, and attenuates haloperidol-induced catalepsy. These effects appear to be mediated by stimulation of the 5-HT2C receptor. In addition, alstonine, similarly to clozapine, indirectly inhibits the reuptake of glutamate in hippocampal slices. Unlike clozapine however, the effect of which is abolished by the D2 receptor agonist apomorphine, alstonine requires 5-HT2A and 5-HT2C receptors to produce this effect, as it is abolished by antagonists of these receptors. Also unlike clozapine, alstonine lacks pro-convulsant activity in mice.

See also 
 Ajmalicine
 Corynanthine
 Deserpidine
 Mitragynine
 Rauwolscine
 Spegatrine
 Reserpine
 Rescinnamine
 Yohimbine

References

Indoloquinolizines
Antipsychotics
Indole alkaloids
Serotonin receptor agonists